AlbaStar S.A. is a privately-owned Spanish airline headquartered in Palma de Mallorca that carries out scheduled and charter flights.

History 

Albastar was founded in 2009 by Italian and British entrepreneurs and obtained its Air Operator Certificate in 2010 as a charter carrier for tour operators. The companies' first aircraft, a Boeing 737-400 was named “Pino D’Urso” after the airline's founder. 

In 2014, AlbaStar inaugurated an operational base at Milan Malpensa Airport. In 2019, the airline obtained the IOSA certification (International Operational Safety Audit) and became a member of the International Air Transport Association.

Destinations 

Albastar operates charter flights to European leisure destinations on behalf of tour operators as well under its own brand name. It also operates Italian domestic services from Trapani.

Fleet

As of November 2022, the Albastar fleet consists of the following aircraft:

References

External links

Official website

Airlines of Spain
Airlines established in 2009